The 1988 VFL National Panasonic Cup was the Victorian Football League Pre-season Cup competition played in its entirety before the Victorian Football League's 1988 Premiership Season began. It culminated the final in March 1988. This was the first of the night premierships to be played entirely in the pre-season.

Games

1st Round

|- bgcolor="#CCCCFF"
| Home team
| Home team score
| Away team
| Away team score
| Ground
| Crowd
| Date
|- bgcolor="#FFFFFF"

| Fitzroy
| 14.10 (94)
| Footscray
| 7.13 (55)
| VFL Park
| 8,921
| Wednesday 10 February
|- bgcolor="#FFFFFF"
|  Carlton
| 5.8 (38)
| Richmond
| 15.3 (93)
| VFL Park
| 14,185
| Saturday 13 February
|- bgcolor="#FFFFFF"
| Geelong
| 12.7 (79)
| St Kilda
| 7.17 (59)
| VFL Park
| -
| Sunday 14 February
|- bgcolor="#FFFFFF"
| Hawthorn
| 16.9 (105)
| Brisbane
| 12.8 (80)
| VFL Park
| -
| Sunday 14 February
|- bgcolor="#FFFFFF"
| Collingwood
| 16.13 (109)
| North Melbourne
| 11.9 (75)
| VFL Park
| 13,938
| Wednesday 17 February
|- bgcolor="#FFFFFF"
| West Coast| 19.14 (128)| Sydney
| 5.11 (41)
| WACA Ground
| 12,587
| Saturday 20 February

Quarter-finals

|- bgcolor="#CCCCFF"
| Home team| Home team score| Away team| Away team score| Ground| Crowd| Date|- bgcolor="#FFFFFF"
| Fitzroy| 18.10 (118)|  Melbourne
| 13.8 (86)
| VFL Park
| 10,273
| Wednesday 24 February
|- bgcolor="#FFFFFF"
| Geelong| 15.18 (108)|  Richmond
| 9.7 (61)
| VFL Park
| 11,813
| Saturday 27 February
|- bgcolor="#FFFFFF"
| Collingwood
| 11.10 (76)
| Hawthorn| 14.9 (93)| VFL Park
| 17,433
| Wednesday 9 March
|- bgcolor="#FFFFFF"
| Essendon| 14.12 (96)| West Coast
| 8.12 (60)
| VFL Park
| 5,992
| Saturday 12 March

Semi-finals

|- bgcolor="#CCCCFF"
| Home team| Home team score| Away team| Away team score| Ground| Crowd| Date|- bgcolor="#FFFFFF"
| Fitzroy
| 5.6 (36)
| Geelong| 8.16 (64)| VFL Park
| 8,596
| Wednesday 16 March
|- bgcolor="#FFFFFF"
| Essendon
| 9.7 (61)
| Hawthorn| 15.14 (104)| VFL Park
| 15,494
| Saturday 19 March

Final

|- bgcolor="#CCCCFF"
| Home team| Home team score| Away team| Away team score| Ground| Crowd| Date|- bgcolor="#FFFFFF"
| Geelong
| 9.13 (67)
| Hawthorn| 10.10 (70)'''
| VFL Park
| 35,803
| Saturday 26 March

See also

List of Australian Football League night premiers
1988 VFL season

References

 Australian Football 150 Years - AFL History & Stats, stats.afl.com.au > 1988 pre-season

Australian Football League pre-season competition
1988 in Australian rules football